Post-amendment to the Tamil Nadu Entertainments Tax Act 1939 on 1 April 1958, Gross jumped to 140 per cent of Nett Commercial Taxes Department disclosed 69 crore in entertainment tax revenue for the year.

The following is a list of films produced in the Tamil film industry in India in 1989, presented in alphabetical order.

Released films

References

1989
Films, Tamil
Lists of 1989 films by country or language
1980s Tamil-language films